Starlink is a very large satellite constellation by SpaceX.

Starlink may also refer to:
 StarLink corn, a strain of genetically modified maize
 Starlink Aviation, a Canadian airline service
 Starlink Project, an astronomical computing project
 Starlink: Battle for Atlas, a 2018 video game
 St Andrews Rail Link (StARLink), a proposed railway project in St Andrews, Scotland

See also
 Star topology
 Starnet (disambiguation)